Jessie Margaret Soga, LRAM (21 August 1870 – 23 February 1954) was a Xhosa/Scottish contralto singer, music teacher and suffragist. She was described as the only black suffrage campaigner based in Scotland. Soga was a lead member of the Women's Freedom League in Glasgow and later joined the Women's Social and Political Union; but did not carry out militant activity, using her organisational skills and musical talent to raise funds.

Family and early life
Jessie Soga was the youngest daughter of Reverend Tiyo Soga (1831–1871), the first black South African minister to be ordained, who became a missionary and translator. She was born in Tutura (Somerville) in Transkei, the Cape, South Africa, a year before her father's death in 1871. Her mother was Scottish missionary Janet Burnside (1827–1903), who met her father when he was in Scotland whilst studying theology in Glasgow. Her mother and siblings returned to Scotland when he died, and Jessie and all the other children went to school at Dollar Academy.

She attended and had fees paid from 1879 to 1882.  In 1882, Jessie was commended in her sewing class, ten years later took a course in 1892 at the Edinburgh School of Art and was awarded 2nd class level pass for Plant Drawing in Outline. She was highly commended in the Girls Own Paper puzzle competition in 1897, although she was already teaching singing, and performing by then, for example as soloist at the Kelvingrove United Presbyterian Choir's "very creditable performance" of The Wreck of the Hesperus, and as soloist at Coatbridge Corporation Recitals.

The Soga siblings, apart from Jessie, returned to live in South Africa: William Anderson Soga (1858–1948) who became a doctor and missionary; John Henderson Soga (1860–1941), who also became a missionary; Allan Kirkland Soga (1861–1938), an early mover in the African National Congress; her sisters, Isabella Macfarlane Soga (1864–1884) and Frances Maria Anne Soga (1868–1942) also worked in Christian missions, and Jotello Festiri Soga (1865–1906), who became South Africa's first black veterinary surgeon. Jessie stayed with her mother and they holidayed with a friend in St. Andrews in August 1901.

Musical education and career
Soga was  described as a "new contralto" when she performed with other soloists in a Glasgow City Hall concert on 16 November 1895, and was already offering private music tuition.

Soga formally completed her professional studies in Singing and music in 1894 and 1895, under Richard Cummings, Llewela Davies and George E. Mott at the Royal Academy of Music, London, whilst living at 8 South Crescent, Bedford Square. Her qualifications were firstly as a singing teacher in December 1901 licenciate (LRAM) and almost a decade later in September 1910, RAM examiners, Henry William Richards and William Gray McNaught  passed her for Voice-Culture and Class Singing.

Her musical education and reach was international, as she had studied under Italian singing teacher Alberto Giovannini at the Milan Conservatory; he also taught Irish composer Thomas O'Brien Butler as well as Italian tenor Francesco Tagmagno and Austrian baritone Joseph Kaschmann. She also advertised being taught in Paris (presumably before he left for America in 1904) by Jacques Bouhy. One of Soga's own pupils was African-American Helen A. Moore of Fiske Jubilee Singers whilst on an international tour and performing in Glasgow, who said later (in 1930) that she rated Soga as "among the leading vocalists of the country".

Soga performed at a "successful concert" of Beethoven's Mass in C major with 90 voices of the Blairgowrie and Rattray Choral Society on 30 March 1899, when her solo singing was commended:
'"Miss Soga proved a great favourite. She is the possessor of a rich mellow voice, which manifests at times the caressing quality characteristic of a daughter of the Orient. She was heartily encored for her first song, and responded with a sympathetic rendering of Bonnie Wee Thing; whilst Stay at Home was sweetly interpreted." Her outfit was also described in a section called "Some of the Dresses [by Helen]" as "old gold satin, veiled black-striped gauze, the rounded yoke of the high bodice being defined by graduated ruches of black chiffon."Soga was a member of Wellington United Free Church in Glasgow, and was the Corresponding Secretary for the church's  Christian Endeavour Society. Topics that were the subject of the Society's programme included Mission work and Temperance. The Society was for younger members of the church, and its aim was to "promote an earnest Christian life among its members."

Soga sang a solo "Like as the hart desireth" from Psalm 42 during a Social Evening in the church in May 1902.

On 1 January 1903, Soga was the contralto soloist in the Coatbridge Choral Union "Grand New Year's Mid-Day Concert" performance of Handel's Messiah, but on that occasion she was described as "weak at the outset but she improved wonderfully as time went on ... her best effort was the passage 'He was despised'." She performed in Messiah again at Turriff on 15 December 1903, with their choral society.

In September 1910 she passed the examination in voice-culture and class-singing at the Royal Academy of Music. 

As she continued to perform at venues large and small across Scotland, with choral groups, or as a soloist, she also supported fundraising and political events, in 1910, singing for the British Women's Temperance Association in St Andrew's Hall, Glasgow at the World Women's Christian Temperance Union International Convention, with the international youth choir of 600 voices, and adding variety between speakers at local branches of the Temperance League or Land League. Its journal in 1919 noted "the success of the gathering was in no small measure due to the excellent entertainment provided by, […] the songs by Miss Soga.

Soga advertised in The Scotsman for singing pupils, teaching weekly in a piano specialist salesroom, near a girls' school in Stafford Street, Edinburgh.

Soga used her singing talents and connections in organising entertainments or raising money as part of the leadership in Glasgow of the women's suffrage campaign between 1908 to 1917.

In 1924, Soga joined An Commun Gaidhealach but it is not known if she performed at any of the National Mòds.

Involvement in women's suffrage campaign
In 1908, Soga was one of the "prime movers", according to suffrage campaign leader Teresa Billington-Greig, in creating a large new Women's Freedom League branch in the prosperous West End of Glasgow (Hillhead). The public launch meeting at the Hillhead Burgh Hall greatly exceeded expectations, as the numbers overflowed the main hall and a second room, with a large membership as a result. Soga and E.S. Semple were appointed joint branch secretary in February 1908 and hosted an "At Home" event in the same halls in April, with Margaret Irwin (trade unionist) as keynote speaker.

The size and scale of events included national occasions, such as in March 1908, when Soga provided the singing, organised recitations and a violinist at an "overflowing" event at Glasgow's grand Grecian buildings (Prince of Wales Halls) to welcome released Scottish (WSPU) prisoners from Holloway. It was Agnes Husband of Dundee who welcomed the speakers Amy Sanderson and Anna Munro (both prisoners themselves, who shared a hymn sung in prison, and were already on the WFL National Executive Committee) and the other speaker was WFL leader Teresa Billington-Greig. By October that year, fortnightly branch meetings were being held, with Soga still joint branch secretary, now with M.Barrowman. Her name is mentioned in private letters between suffrage leaders Helen Crawfurd and Janet Barrowman.

Soga's model of a "Cafe Chantant" was one of the most successful events, in attracting large numbers and raising £75, and was rolled out to other branches. She also organised the entertainment for the WSPU "Scottish Exhibition" at Charing Cross, and for smaller branch meeting socials. She made contributions from her concert earnings and teaching fees, including towards the London WSPU events.

Although involved in the Women's Social and Political Union she did not take part in violent protests. She chaired WSPU meetings in nearby towns, like Blackwood, and donated home-made marmalade for sale at events. She also organised a profitable circulating library, personally donating books to the WSPU Sauchiehall Street office, and donated for a six months' subscription to Women's Franchise to be sent to Woodside District Library Soga's involvement in WSPU ended around 1917, though WSPU had suspended itself when World War One broke out in 1914, in an agreement to end militant action in return for releasing women who had been imprisoned.

The 1918 Representation of the People Act gave some women the right to vote.

Soga died in the Old People's Cottages in Rottenrow in the early hours of 23 February 1954, aged 83, and her funeral was at the Western Necropolis Crematorium, Glasgow.

 Awareness of her role 
In 2021, as yet, no accessible images of Soga have been identified, nor is it known if there were other Scottish women of colour campaigning for the vote. Dr. TS Beall said Scotland's suffragists' and suffragettes' activities were not taught 'much' in Scottish schools, and their names were not generally known.

Soga was included in a new educational game (Top Trumps-style) on Scotland's Suffragettes Trumps, produced by Protests & Suffragettes'' (an artists, activists and local history group including Dr. Beall) by crowdfunding to send 700 sets to schools. Women's History Scotland's Dr. Yvonne McFadden called it 'a fun and important tool to make sure these women and their stories' are included in the Scottish school curriculum, as women's history is often limited in school history teaching.

Further information 
Soga's name has been added to the website "PlainsightSOUND", an online history of Black Classical musicians in the United Kingdom. Her name and a short biography have been added to its timeline.

References

1870 births
1954 deaths
Scottish contraltos
South African contraltos
South African suffragists
South African emigrants to the United Kingdom
Scottish people of South African descent
South African people of Scottish descent
South African people of Xhosa descent